Hatoba Park is a park along the Sumida River, northeast of Kachidoki Bridge, in Chūō, Tokyo, Japan.

See also

 List of parks and gardens in Tokyo

References

External links
 
 

Chūō, Tokyo
Parks and gardens in Tokyo